The International Islamic Unity Conference is an international conference which is held every year during the Islamic Unity week in Tehran, Iran, and is organized by “the World Forum for Proximity of Islamic Schools of Thought”. The main target of the conference is devising the ways of unity for Islamic world, and likewise sympathy/consultation between scholars and scientists in order to approach their viewpoints in intended fields. The subjects of its meetings are determined based on divergent issues/problems of Islamic world. The meeting is kicked off with the attendance of many scholars, religious thinkers and prominent figures from diverse countries.

Background
The First International Islamic Unity Conference was inaugurated in 1987 in Tehran, Iran. After holding the 4th Islamic unity conference which was organized by Islamic Promotions Organization of Iran, then Ayatollah Khamenei as the supreme leader of Iran ordered to establish “the World Forum for Proximity of Islamic Schools of Thought”, since then, the conference is organized by the mentioned forum.

Members/Guests
 
A number of well-known figures from all over the globe are taken part in the event. On the whole, the participants (as the members/guests) include Islamic scholars, ministers of Islamic countries, clerics, intellectuals, representatives of scientific/cultural organizations and other significant individuals from different countries of the world. For instance, at the 29th Islamic unity conference there were over 600 prominent figures from Iran (as the host) and 70 countries from around the globe who participated in the meeting.

The 30th conference

The 30th Islamic unity conference was opened by president Rouhani, speech under the banner of "Unity, Necessity of Countering Takfiri movements" in Tehran, on 15 December 2016 with participation of diverse participants from different countries, such as: China, Iraq, UK, Malaysia, Indonesia, Lebanon, Thailand, Australia, Russia and so on, including more than domestic and foreign guests, several scholars and likewise 220 famous figures from different countries of the world took part in the conference. Additionally, the 31st international Islamic unity conference was held on 4-6 Dec 2017 in Tehran.

See also
 Outline of Islam
 Glossary of Islam
 Index of Islam-related articles

References

Islam and politics
Shia–Sunni relations